All-Flash, originally published as All-Flash Quarterly, was a comic book magazine series published by All-American Publications and later National Periodicals (DC Comics) featuring superhero Jay Garrick, the original Flash. The series was the first solo feature given to the Flash, who also appeared in the anthologies Flash Comics, All-Star Comics, and Comic Cavalcade. It ran for 32 issues from 1941 to 1947 and was originally published on a quarterly basis before changing over to a bi-monthly schedule with issue #6. Each issue regularly contained several stories featuring the Flash, as well as minor back-up features like Hop Harrigan, Butch McLobster, The Super Mobster, and Fat and Slat by cartoonist Ed Wheelan and, in later issues, Ton-O-Fun by Flash co-creator Harry Lampert.

Publication history

Original series
The series debuted with a Summer 1941 cover date. Since the title Flash Comics was already in use another name was needed for the series, so it was decided that a contest was to be held in which readers were encouraged to submit their own ideas for the title of the new series. Twenty-five dollars in cash prizes were offered to the four best names submitted, with $10.00 promised to the 1st-place winner of the contest. To the first 500 who submitted a free copy of All-Star Comics #5 was offered. An advertisement for the contest appeared in the pages of All-Star Comics #4 stating "The Flash wins and becomes the next quarterly like Superman and Batman! Boys and girls! Here is a message from Gardner F. Fox and E.E. Hibbard, the author and artist of your favorite feature, the Flash!"

The winner of the contest was announced in the pages of All-Star Comics #5, with an ad featuring the cover art for the first issue of All-Flash.

Flash co-creator Gardner Fox wrote the bulk of the series, scripting the main feature in the first 24 issues. From issue #25 and on, the main Flash features in the book were scripted by writers Robert Kanigher and John Broome. Art duties for the series were handled by a host of contributors, like artist E. E. Hibbard, Harry Tschida, Lou Ferstadt, Martin Naydel, Lee Elias, and Carmine Infantino.

The series marked the first time writers Robert Kanigher and John Broome, and artist Carmine Infantino worked on the Flash character. Kanigher, Broome, and Infantino would later help create the Silver Age Flash, as well as his sidekick Kid Flash, who would in turn become the third incarnation of the character.    
     
All-Flash ended its run in 1947 with issue #32

2007 one-shot
The title returned in 2007 as a one-shot by writer Mark Waid and artists Karl Kerschl, Manuel Garcia, Joe Bennett, and Daniel Acuna, with cover art by Josh Middleton and a variant cover by Bill Sienkiewicz. The one-shot served as a lead-in to Flash vol. 2 #231.

Notable issues

References

1941 comics debuts
1948 comics endings
Comics magazines published in the United States
Comics by Gardner Fox
Comics by Robert Kanigher
DC Comics titles
Defunct American comics
Earth-Two
Flash (comics)
Golden Age comics titles